This is a timeline showing the dates when countries or polities made Christianity the official state religion, generally accompanying the baptism of the governing monarch.

Adoptions of Christianity to AD 1450
  or 200 – Osroene – disputed; both dates claimed
 179 – Silures; traditional date, now considered questionable
 301 – Christianization of Armenia 
  – Christianisation of Greece
  – Caucasian Albania
  – Christianization of Iberia
  – Kingdom of Aksum
 337 – Roman Empire (baptism of Constantine I)
 361 – Rome returns to paganism under Julian the Apostate
 364 – Rome returns to Christianity, specifically the Arian Church
  – Vandals (Arian Church)
 376 – Goths and Gepids (Arian Church)
 380 – Rome goes from Arian to Catholic/Orthodox (both terms are used refer to the same Church until 1054)
 411 – Kingdom of Burgundy (Catholic Church)
  – Najran (Catholic Church)
 448 – Suebi (Catholic Church)
  – Burgundy goes from Catholic to Arian
 451 – Aksum and Najran are Coptic with Chalcedonian Schism.
 466 – Suebi go from Catholic to Arian
 473 – Ghassanids (Catholic Church)
 480 – Lazica (Catholic Church)
 491 – Armenia and Caucasian Albania go from Catholic to Apostolic
 496 – Franks (Catholic Church) 
 506 – Iberia goes from Catholic to Apostolic
  – Ghassanids go from Catholic to Coptic 
 516 – Burgundy returns from Arian to Catholic
  – Makuria (Catholic), Nobatia and Alodia (Coptic Church)
  – Suebi return from Arian to Catholic
  – Christianization of Ireland (Celtic Church)
  – Picts (Celtic Church)
  – Lombards (Arian Church) 
 569 – Garamantes (Catholic Church)
 589 – Visigoths go from Arian to Catholic
 591 – Lombards go from Arian to Catholic
  – Lakhmids (Nestorian Church)
 601 – Kent (Catholic Church)
 604 – East Anglia and Essex (Catholic)
 607 – Iberia returns from Apostolic to Catholic
 616 – Kent and Essex return to paganism
  – Alemanni (Catholic Church)
 624 – Kent returns from pagan to Catholic
 627 – Lombards return from Catholic to Arian
 627 – Northumbria – (Catholic Church); East Anglia returns from Catholic to pagan
 630 - East Anglia returns from pagan to Catholic
 635 – Wessex (Catholic Church)
 653 – Lombards return from Arian to Catholic
 653 – Essex returns from pagan to Catholic
 655 – Mercia (Catholic Church)
 675 – Sussex (Catholic Church)
 692 – Ireland goes from Celtic to Catholic
 696 – Bavaria (Catholic)
 710 – Picts go from Celtic to Catholic
  – Makuria goes from Catholic to Coptic
 724 – Thuringia
 734 – Frisians
 785 – Saxons
  Duchy of Lower Pannonia
 831 – Moravia
 864 – Christianization of Bulgaria
  – Christianization of the Serbs
 879 – Duchy of Croatia
 911 – Normans
 960 – Denmark
 966 – Christianization of Poland
 973 – Christianization of Hungary(started non officially, more Orthodox than Roman Catholic)
  – Christianization of Kievan Rus'
 995 – Norway
 999 – Faroe Islands
  Christianisation became official policy in Hungary with the first real Christian king(Roman Catholic became official but Orthodox(Eastern) existed as well even after 1054). 
  – Christianisation of Iceland
 1007 – Kerait Khanate – Nestorian Church
  – Sweden
 1054 – Byzantine Empire, Kingdom of Georgia, Bulgaria, Serbs, and Rus' are Eastern Orthodox Christian with East-West Schism
 1124 – Conversion of Pomerania
  – Finland
 1227 – Livonia (including mainland Estonia and northern Latvia), Cumania
 1241 – Saaremaa 
 1260 – Curonians
 1290 – Semigallians
 1387 – Christianization of Lithuania
 1413 – Samogitia

Adoptions after 1450

 1491 – Kingdom of Kongo (Roman Catholic Church)
 1519 – Tlaxcala (Roman Catholic Church)
 1521 – Rajahnate of Cebu (Roman Catholic Church)
 1523 – Sweden goes from Catholic to Lutheran
 1528 – Schleswig-Holstein goes from Catholic to Lutheran
 1534 – England goes from Catholic to Anglican
 1536 – Denmark-Norway and Iceland go from Catholic to Lutheran
 1553 – England returns from Anglican to Catholic
 1558 – Kabardia (E. Orthodox Church)
 1558 – England returns from Catholic to Anglican
 1560 – Scotland goes from Catholic to Presbyterian
 1610 – Mi'kmaq (Roman Catholic Church)
 1624 – Kingdom of Ndongo (Roman Catholic Church)
 1624 – Ethiopia goes from Coptic to Catholic
 1631 – Kingdom of Matamba (Roman Catholic Church)
 1633 – Ethiopia returns from Catholic to Coptic
 1640 – Piscataway (Roman Catholic Church)
 1642 – Huron-Wendat Nation (Roman Catholic Church)
 1650 – Kingdom of Larantuka (Roman Catholic Church)
 1654 – Onondaga (Roman Catholic Church)
 1663–1665 – Kingdom of Loango (briefly Roman Catholic)
 1675 – Illinois Confederation (Roman Catholic Church)
 1700s – Kingdom of Bolaang Mongondow (Reformed Church)
 1819 – Kingdom of Tahiti, Kingdom of Hawaii (Congregational Church)
 1829 – Spokane, Kutenai (Anglican Church)
 1830 – Samoa (Congregational Church)
 1838 – Nez Perce (Presbyterian Church) 
 1869 – Merina Kingdom (Reformed Church)
 1882 – Blackfoot Confederacy (Roman Catholic Church)
 1880 – Shoshone (LDS Church)
 1884 – Lakota (Roman Catholic Church)
 1884 – Catawba (LDS Church)
 1897 – Shoshone go from LDS to Anglican
 1907 – Arapaho (Baptist Church)

See also
 History of Christianity
 Christianization

References

Timelines of Christianity
Conversion to Christianity